The Mississippi State Bulldogs football program represents Mississippi State University in the sport of American football. The Bulldogs compete in the Football Bowl Subdivision (FBS) of the National Collegiate Athletic Association (NCAA) and the Western Division of the Southeastern Conference (SEC). They also have won one SEC championship in 1941 and a division championship in 1998. The Bulldogs have 26 postseason bowl appearances. The program has produced 38 All-Americans (2 consensus), 171 All-SEC selections, and 124 NFL players (11 first-round draft picks). The Bulldogs’ home stadium, Davis Wade Stadium at Scott Field, is the second oldest in the NCAA Division I FBS.

History

Early history (1895–1966)
Mississippi State (then known as the Mississippi A&M Aggies) first fielded a football team in 1895. The team was coached by W. M. Matthews. During his one-season tenure, Matthews posted an overall record of zero wins and two losses (0–2). He is also credited with the selection of what became the official school colors, maroon and white, prior to the Aggies first game ever played at Union University.

Daniel S. Martin left rival Ole Miss and served as the Aggies' head football coach from 1903–1906. His final record in Starkville was 10–11–3. W. D. Chadwick led the Aggies from 1909–1913. His final record was 29–12–2. During his five-season tenure, Mississippi A&M appeared in and won its first bowl game, the 1911 Bacardi Bowl in Havana, Cuba. Fullback Dutch Reule was selected All-Southern. The 1911 team was also referred to as 'The Bull Dogs'. Earl C. Hayes replaced Chadwick and led Mississippi A&M to 15–8–2 record from 1914–1916. Hunter Kimball received the most votes of any All-Southern halfback in 1914. The Mississippi Legislature renamed Mississippi A&M as "Mississippi State College" in 1925 and the mascot was changed from Aggies to Maroons in 1932. Ralph Sasse enjoyed success as Mississippi State's head football coach. After leading Mississippi State to a 20–10–2 record in three years and an appearance in the 1937 Orange Bowl, a loss, Sasse stunned the students and players by resigning from his head coach's duties, following a doctor's orders after a sudden nervous breakdown. Allyn McKeen left Memphis to become head football coach at Mississippi State, where he compiled a 65–19–3 record in ten seasons. In 1940, he was named Southeastern Conference Coach of the Year after leading Mississippi State to its only undefeated season in school history and its second Orange Bowl appearance, a victory. The following year, 1941, his Maroons squad captured the first and only Southeastern Conference championship in program history. McKeen retired from coaching in 1948 after being fired by Athletic Director Dudy Noble because of a 4–4–1 season. He was inducted into the College Football Hall of Fame as a coach in 1991. Mississippi State did not field a football team in 1943. Arthur Morton left VMI to become MSU's head football coach after McKeen's retirement. Morton's Maroons posted struggling records of 0–8–1, 4–5 and 4–5 for a cumulative record of 8–18–1 before Morton's firing. Murray Warmath came to Mississippi State from his post as line coach at Army and posted records of 5–4 and 5–2–3 for a cumulative two-season record of 10–6–3. Having coached only two seasons in Starkville, Warmath resigned after the 1953 season to take the job of University of Minnesota head coach. Darrell Royal came to Mississippi State from the CFL's Edmonton Eskimos and put up back-to-back 6–4 records in his two seasons as the Maroons head football coach. Royal resigned after the 1955 season to accept the head football coach position at Washington.

Wade Walker was promoted from line coach to head coach following Royal's departure. Walker compiled a 22–32–2 record over his 6-season tenure. In 1958 the Legislature renamed the university as Mississippi State University. The Mississippi State Maroons posted a lackluster 2–7–1 record in 1959. The following year, Walker's Maroons improved to 5–5, but students, fans and alumni demanded his ouster. University president Dean W. Colvard relented and fired Walker as football coach, but kept him on as athletic director, a post he kept until 1966. Mississippi State changed its mascot from Maroons to Bulldogs in 1960. However, "Bulldogs" had been used unofficially since at least 1905, and the nickname had long been interchangeable with "Maroons." Paul Davis was promoted from assistant coach to head coach following Walker's firing. His teams went 20–38–2 overall and 9–22–2 in the Southeastern Conference in Davis' five seasons. The Bulldogs had a 7–2–2 record in 1963, earning its first postseason bowl game since 1939. The team finished the season with a 16–12 victory over North Carolina State in front of 8,309 fans at the 1963 Liberty Bowl played in a bitter cold Philadelphia. Mississippi State was able to convert two botched North Carolina State punts into touchdowns, and a 13–0 lead at the first quarter. United Press International named Davis the SEC Coach of the Year for the 1963 season. After a lackluster 2–8 record in 1966, MSU terminated Davis, as well as athletic director Wade Walker.

Charles Shira era (1967–1972)
Charles Shira, who had been defensive coordinator for the University of Texas under former Bulldogs head coach Darrell Royal, was named to fill the head coaching position as well as the vacant post of athletic director. In his first season, his team won two games, followed by none the following year. Mississippi State improved to 3–7 in 1969. That year, Shira served as the coach for the Gray squad in the Blue-Gray Classic. Mississippi State posted a surprising six-win season in 1970, including a victory over rival No. 10 Ole Miss. For the accomplishment, the SEC named Shira its Coach of the Year. In 1969, Shira became the first MSU football coach to coach a black player, Frank Dowsing. In 1972, having compiled a record of 16–45–2, Shira resigned as head coach to focus on his duties as athletic director.

Bob Tyler era (1973–1978)
Bob Tyler was promoted from offensive coordinator to head coach of the Bulldogs football team after Shira's resignation. Tyler led Mississippi State to a 9–3 season and a victory in the 1974 Sun Bowl over North Carolina. During that season, his team beat perennial powerhouses, Georgia and LSU. The Bulldogs' record was 6–4–1 in 1975, and it was an impressive 9–2 in 1976, ending the season ranked No. 20 in the AP Poll.  His team compiled a 5–6 record in 1977, and he went 6–5 in his final season with the Bulldogs. Mississippi State was placed on probation by the NCAA prior to the 1975 season due to alleged improper benefits to student athletes. The school sought and won court approval to play in an adverse legal opinion to the NCAA. Although the alleged infraction was trivial, the NCAA forced the school to forfeit most games it won in 1975, 1976, and 1977.

Emory Bellard era (1979–1985)
Emory Bellard, who had resigned as head coach of Texas A&M during the 1978 season after only six games, was hired to serve as head football coach at Mississippi State beginning with the next (1979) season. He was head coach from 1979 until 1985. He was considered to have had one of the most innovative offensive minds in football and is credited for inventing the wishbone formation. Bellard spent seven seasons as head coach at MSU. His best years as the Bulldogs head coach were in 1980 and 1981, when his team finished 9–3 and 8–4, respectively. Also, Bellard was the coach when Mississippi State defeated number 1, undefeated Alabama 6–3 in Jackson, Mississippi, in 1980. However, the Bulldogs significantly regressed after 1981. In the next five seasons, he only won a total of five games in SEC play. Before the 1985 season, Bellard boldly predicted that the Bulldogs would rebound and win their first SEC title since 1941. They not only failed to do so, but went winless in SEC play. Bellard was fired after the season. He would, however, return in 1988 to coach at the high school level in Texas.

Rockey Felker era (1986–1990)
Rockey Felker returned to his alma mater, which was coming off four consecutive losing seasons, from his post as wide receivers coach at Alabama. At 33, Felker was the youngest coach in the country and the first Mississippi State coach in 30 years to start his career as MSU head football coach with a winning record (6–5). However, the Bulldogs never recovered from four consecutive blowout losses at the end of the 1986 season, during which they scored a total of nine points, including a 24–3 loss to Ole Miss.  Felker suffered through four losing seasons (4–7, 1–10, 5–6, 5–6) between 1987 and 1990, and only won a total of five games in SEC play. He was only 1–4 vs. Ole Miss. He resigned under pressure at the end of the 1990 season, but would be brought back by his successor, Jackie Sherrill, as running backs coach for two seasons and in a non-coaching position in the football program, where he serves to this day.

Jackie Sherrill era (1991–2003)
After three years away from the game, former Washington State, Pittsburgh and Texas A&M head coach Jackie Sherrill was hired as head football coach at Mississippi State in 1991. He took over a program that hadn't had a winning season since 1986 (and had won a total of 14 games in that stretch) and hadn't had a winning record in Southeastern Conference play since 1981. Sherrill began his Mississippi State career with an upset victory over a familiar foe from his A&M days, the Texas Longhorns (who were the defending Southwest Conference champions). In thirteen seasons in Starkville, Sherrill coached the Bulldogs to a record of 75–75–2. His 75 wins are the most in school history.  He led the team to an SEC West title in 1998, and a berth in the Cotton Bowl Classic. A year later, he notched a 10–2 record and No. 12 final ranking. That No. 12 ranking was the highest final ranking achieved by any NCAA Division I-A school in Mississippi in over 30 years.  Sherrill, along with Bill Snyder of Kansas State, were among the first to use the rich JUCO systems of their respective states to help their programs progress. Although Sherrill won only eight games in his last three seasons, he built Mississippi State into a consistent winner despite playing in the same division as powerhouses like Alabama, Auburn and LSU. He also finished with a winning record against in-state rival Ole Miss (7–6).  Under Sherrill, the Bulldogs went to six bowl games; before his arrival they'd only been to seven bowls in 96 years of play. Sherrill also achieved notoriety by having his team observe the castration of a bull as a motivational technique prior to a game versus Texas. Unranked Mississippi State subsequently beat the No. 13 ranked Longhorns. Sherrill retired after the 2003 season, which was followed by the NCAA levying probation for four years on the program. Despite a prolonged 3-year investigation by the NCAA, Mississippi State was not found guilty of any major violations, and Sherrill was never personally found guilty of any NCAA rules violations at either Mississippi State or Texas A&M.

Sylvester Croom era (2004–2008)

Sylvester Croom, a longtime assistant in the NFL and a former player for Bear Bryant at Alabama, was hired to replace Sherrill. Croom is a significant figure, because he is not only the first African American head football coach in Mississippi State history, but also in SEC football history. When Croom was hired at Mississippi State, he inherited a program that was riddled with NCAA sanctions and had not won consistently since the 1990s. Croom led the Bulldogs to a 3–8 (2–6 SEC) record in 2004. State began the season with a victory over Tulane, then lost five straight, to No. 18 Auburn, Maine, No. 13 LSU, Vanderbilt and UAB. The next week, State upset No. 20 Florida in what turned out to be the game that got Florida head coach Ron Zook fired. The next game saw State beat Kentucky. State then lost their final three games of the season to Alabama, Arkansas and Ole Miss. In 2005, State again finished 3–8. After defeating Murray State in the season opener, State lost to Auburn then beat Tulane in Shreveport, Louisiana. State then lost seven consecutive games, starting with No. 7 Georgia, then No. 4 LSU, No. 13 Florida, Houston, Kentucky, No. 4 Alabama and Arkansas. State defeated Ole Miss in the Egg Bowl to finish the season.

Mississippi State struggled to a 3–9 record in 2006. State lost its first three games of the season to South Carolina, No. 4 Auburn, Tulane, State beat UAB to get its first win of the year in the fourth game. Losses to No 9 LSU and No. 4 West Virginia followed, then State defeated Jacksonville State to snap the two-game skid. State then lost to Georgia and Kentucky. MSST then upset Alabama in Alabama before losing to No. 5 Arkansas and Ole Miss. During the 2007 season, during which his team won eight games, including the Liberty Bowl, Croom garnered Coach of the Year awards from three organizations. On December 4, 2007, Croom was named coach of the year by the American Football Coaches Association for region two. The AFCA has five regional coaches of the year and announces a national coach of the year each January. That same year, on December 5, Croom was named SEC Coach of the Year twice, once as voted by the other SEC coaches and once as voted by The Associated Press. It was the first time a Mississippi State coach received the AP honor since Charley Shira in 1970 and the first time a Mississippi State coach received the coaches award since Wade Walker in 1957. After a 4–8 record in 2008, culminating with a 45–0 loss to rival No. 25 Ole Miss, Croom was asked by school officials to resign as head coach of the Bulldogs.

Dan Mullen era (2009–2017)

Florida offensive coordinator Dan Mullen was hired as Mississippi State's head coach in late 2008. Mullen arrived in Starkville with an explosive offensive background and a reputation as a quarterback guru, having tutored Alex Smith, Chris Leak and Tim Tebow during his career as an assistant coach. Serving under head coach Urban Meyer, Mullen oversaw an offense at Florida that was one of the most explosive in the country, helped the Gators capture the 2006 and 2008 national championships and sent many players into the National Football League. In Mullen's first season, the Bulldogs finished 5–7, ending upbeat with a 41–27 victory over No. 20 Ole Miss in the Egg Bowl. In 2010, they started 1–2, and then they had a 6-game winning streak to make their record 7–2 before losing to Alabama and Arkansas, but defeated Ole Miss. The team participated in a bowl game for the first time since 2007, soundly defeating Michigan in the Gator Bowl 52–14. In 2011, the Bulldogs entered the season ranked No. 19 in the country, and they started 1–0, before losing to the defending national champion Auburn 41–34. Mississippi State entered the Ole Miss game in Starkville needing a win to qualify for a bowl bid for a second straight season. The Bulldogs won 31–3, earning Mullen the distinction as the first coach to beat Ole Miss in his first three tries since Allyn McKeen in 1941.  The Bulldogs capped off the season with a Music City Bowl win over Wake Forest in Nashville, Tennessee. In 2012, Mississippi State defeated Tennessee 41–31 in their sixth game of the season to become bowl eligible. After a 7–0 start the team won only one of its remaining five games to finish 8–5, including a 41–24 loss at Ole Miss and a 34–20 loss to the No. 21 Northwestern in the Gator Bowl. This was the first time Mississippi State appeared in a bowl three straight years since 2000. In 2013, MSST under Mullen became bowl eligible for the fourth consecutive year following a 17–10 overtime win over Ole Miss. MSST defeated Rice in the Liberty Bowl December 31, 2013 in Memphis, Tennessee, by a score of 44–7. It was MSST's third bowl win in the last four years.

2014 turned out to be the most historic run for the team. Led by quarterback Dak Prescott, the Bulldogs reached a No. 1 national ranking for the first time ever, doing so in both the Amway Coaches Poll and the AP Poll, after beating 3 consecutive top-10 teams (No. 8 LSU Tigers, No. 6 Texas A&M Aggies, and No. 2 Auburn Tigers). As a result, the Bulldogs became the fastest team in AP Poll's history to reach the No. 1 ranking, from being unranked, in only 5 weeks. They also became the first team to be ranked No. 1 in the new FBS Playoff Football Poll and held the top ranking for the first three weeks of the poll before losing to Alabama. However, at the end of the season, only one of the three teams remained ranked. Auburn finished 8–5 (4–4 SEC) and ranked No. 22, and lost to Wisconsin in the Outback Bowl, Texas A&M finished 7–5 (3–5 SEC) and beat West Virginia in the Liberty Bowl, and LSU, finished 8–4 (4–4 SEC) and lost to Notre Dame in the Music City Bowl. The Bulldogs couldn't sustain that momentum, and lost two of their last three regular season games, first to No. 5 Alabama 25–20 and then two weeks later to No. 18 Ole Miss 31–17. That loss knocked the Bulldogs out of playoff contention, leaving them 10–2 and ranked No. 7 by the College Football Playoff Committee in their final rankings. As a result, they were awarded a trip to the Orange Bowl against No. 10 Georgia Tech on December 31, 2014. Thanks to the Bulldogs’ inability to stop Georgia Tech's heavy use of the triple option, State lost that contest 49–34. Mississippi State finished the season 10–3 and were ranked No. 11 in the final AP Poll. In 2015, the Bulldogs went 4–4 in the SEC and finished the regular season with an 8–4 record and went on to play in the 2015 Belk Bowl against the NC State Wolfpack, winning 51–28. Dak Prescott was named the game MVP after throwing 4 touchdowns. 2016 saw the Bulldogs stumble to a 5–7 regular season record. The season included 3 losses on the final play of games against South Alabama, BYU, and Kentucky. The Bulldogs were able to finish the season on a high note defeating in-state rival Ole Miss 55–20 in the 2016 Egg Bowl. Due to a shortage of 6-win teams and MSU's Academic Progress Rate, they made their seventh consecutive bowl appearance in the St. Petersburg Bowl against Miami (OH) on December 26. The Bulldogs won the game thanks to a blocked extra point and a blocked field goal, edging Miami (Ohio) 17–16. On February 27, 2017, Mississippi State athletic director John Cohen announced a four-year contract extension for Coach Mullen through February 2021. On November 26, 2017, after an 8–4 regular season, Dan Mullen left Mississippi State University to become the head coach at the University of Florida.

Joe Moorhead era (2018–2019)
After Dan Mullen’s departure, Mississippi State hired  Penn State offensive coordinator Joe Moorhead as the program's 33rd head coach. Moorhead arrived in Starkville with a reputation as an outstanding offensive mind, turning around a struggling FCS program in Fordham as the head coach before moving to Penn State as offensive coordinator where his offenses set school records. The Mississippi State University administration signed Moorhead to a four-year contract worth a total of $11 million in base salary. On January 3, 2020, after failing to energize the offense, and several off field issues, Mississippi State announced Moorhead's firing.

Mike Leach era (2020–2022)
On January 9, 2020, Mississippi State athletic director John Cohen announced the hiring of Washington State and former Texas Tech head coach Mike Leach to the vacant head coaching position. Leach arrived with a reputation as a great offensive mind and installed a pass-heavy, up-tempo offensive attack known as the Air raid that he has utilized throughout his coaching career. Leach signed a four-year contract with Mississippi State worth $20 million excluding incentives.

Leach died after a heart attack on December 12, 2022.

Zach Arnett era (2022–present)
On December 15, 2022, Zach Arnett was named the 35th head coach of the Bulldogs. Prior to Mike Leach's death, Arnett had been appointed interim head coach after Leach had been hospitalized.

Conference affiliations 
 Independent (1895)
 Southern Intercollegiate Athletic Association (1896–1921).
 Southern Conference (1922–1932)
 Southeastern Conference (1933–present)

Championship

Conference championship 
The 1941 Mississippi State Bulldogs finished the year with an 8–1–1 record, and won the Southeastern Conference championship. The season included wins over Florida, Alabama, Auburn, and Ole Miss. The Bulldogs tied with LSU and were defeated by Duquesne.

Division championship 
The SEC has been split into two divisions since the 1992 season with Mississippi State competing in the SEC West since that time. In 1998, MSU finished the regular season with a 26–14 win over Alabama, a 22–21 win over Arkansas, and a 28–6 win over Ole Miss in Oxford, Mississippi. At the end of the regular season, both MSU and Arkansas finished with 6–2 conference records, but by virtue of MSU's head-to-head win over Arkansas, MSU earned the right to represent the SEC West in the SEC Championship Game. In that game, MSU led eventual national champion Tennessee in the fourth quarter before falling 14–24 in the Georgia Dome. They continued on to play in the Cotton Bowl Classic in Dallas, Texas, against the 20th-ranked Texas Longhorns. The Bulldogs lost the game 11–38 on 24 unanswered Longhorn points in the 3rd quarter.

† Co-champions

Bowl games
Mississippi State has played in 26 bowl games, compiling a record of 15–11 through the 2021 season. Memorable highlights include wins in the 1941 Orange Bowl, the 1963 Liberty Bowl, the 1999 Peach Bowl, and the 2011 Gator Bowl.

Mississippi State's first bowl game was against the Havana Athletic Club in the Bacardi Bowl on January 1, 1912 in Havana, Cuba.  Known as the Mississippi A&M Aggies at that time, the Bulldogs won by a final score of 12–0. Mississippi State does not count the victory against the athletic club among its bowl games and bowl wins.

From 1999 to 2011 Mississippi State had a 5-game winning streak in bowls. The streak ended against the Northwestern Wildcats in the 2013 Gator Bowl. The Bulldogs have been to 12 straight bowl games for the first time in school history dating back to the 2010 season.

Rivalries

Ole Miss

The Battle for the Golden Egg, also known as the Egg Bowl, is the Mississippi State-Ole Miss rivalry. It was first played in 1901 and has been played every year since 1915 (with the exception of the 1943 season when neither school fielded teams due to World War II) making it the tenth longest uninterrupted series in the United States.  The game became "The Battle for the Golden Egg" in 1927 when a traveling trophy was added.  Although through the years the game has been played primarily in 3 locations Starkville (38 times), Oxford (36 times), and Jackson (29 times); there have been a few meetings in other locations including Tupelo 3 times, Greenwood twice, Clarksdale once, and Columbus once.  Through 2021, in total the two squads have met on the gridiron 118 times with Ole Miss holding a 64–45–6 lead in the series.

LSU

The LSU-Mississippi State rivalry is an annual football game between the Louisiana State Tigers and Mississippi State University Bulldogs. Both universities are founding members of the Southeastern Conference, as well as the Western Division. This rivalry is LSU's longest rivalry with 115 meetings.

Mississippi State's 34–29 victory on September 20, 2014, was the Bulldogs' first over LSU since 1999, their first in Baton Rouge since 1991, and just their fourth overall since 1985.

The 1976 game was won on the field by Mississippi State but later deemed by the NCAA to have been forfeited, therefore lost, by the Bulldogs.

Alabama

The Alabama–Mississippi State rivalry, sometimes referred to as the 90 Mile Drive or the Battle for Highway 82, is an annual football game between the University of Alabama Crimson Tide and Mississippi State University Bulldogs. Both universities are founding members of the Southeastern Conference, as well as the Western Division. The two campuses are located approximately 90 miles apart, and are the closest SEC schools in terms of distance.

Entering its 106th meeting as of the 2021 football season, Alabama-Mississippi State is one of the SEC's longest-running series, dating back to 1896.

All-time record vs. SEC teams

Ring of Honor Inductees

Traditions

The Cowbell

The most unusual and certainly the most resounding symbol of Mississippi State University tradition is the cowbell. Despite decades of attempts by opponents and authorities to banish it from scenes of competition, diehard State fans still celebrate Bulldog victories loudly and proudly with the distinctive sound of ringing cowbells.

The precise origin of the cowbell as a fixture of Mississippi State sports tradition remains unclear to this day. The best records have cowbells gradually introduced to the MSU sports scene in the late 1930s and early 1940s, coinciding with the 'golden age' of Mississippi State football success
prior to World War II.

The most popular legend is that during a home football game between State and arch-rival Ole Miss, a jersey cow wandered onto the playing field. Mississippi State soundly whipped the Rebels that Saturday, and State College students immediately adopted the cow as a good luck charm. Students are said to have continued bringing a cow to football games for a while, until the practice was eventually discontinued in favor of bringing just the cow's bell.

Whatever the origin, it is certain that by the 1950s cowbells were common at Mississippi State games, and by the 1960s were established as the special symbol of Mississippi State. Ironically, the cowbell's popularity grew most rapidly during the long years when State football teams were rarely successful. Flaunting this anachronism from the 'aggie' days was a proud response by students and alumni to outsider scorn of the university's 'cow college' history.

In the 1960s two MSU professors, Earl W. Terrell and Ralph L. Reeves obliged some students by welding handles on the bells to they could be rung with much more convenience and authority. By 1963 the demand for these long-handled cowbells could not be filled by home workshops alone, so at the suggestion of Reeves the Student Association bought bells in bulk and the Industrial Education Club agreed to weld on handles. In 1964 the MSU Bookstore began marketing these cowbells with a portion of the profits returning to these student organizations.

Today many styles of cowbells are available on campus and around Starkville, with the top-of-the-line a heavy chrome-plated model with a full Bulldog figurine handle. But some insist the best and loudest results are produced by a classic long-handled, bicycle-grip bell made of thinner and tightly welded shells.

Cowbells decorate offices and homes of Mississippi State alumni, and are passed down through generations of Bulldog fans.

In early 1975, the SEC adopted a rule against artificial noisemakers that made it illegal to ring a cowbell during games; an official complaint by Auburn coach Shug Jordan, whose disapproval of the tradition went back several years, after the Tigers narrow 1974 win over the Bulldogs was largely responsible for the decision. At one point during the game, Jordan instructed his quarterback not to run a play in protest of officials refusing to quiet the crowd. Jordan's dislike for the cowbells inspired Alabama to attempt to purchase 1,000 cowbells from Mississippi State for Alabama fans to take to the Iron Bowl; MSU declined the offer. University of Texas fans also attempted to annoy Jordan with cowbells during the 1974 Gator Bowl. Shortly after the ban was enacted, Mississippi State officials considered other items and devices to replace the cowbells. In 1981, a Mississippi State faculty member filed a suit against Auburn University and the Southeastern Conference that sought to have the rule declared unconstitutional after his cowbell was confiscated at the 1981 AU-MSU game at Jordan–Hare Stadium. Despite creative efforts by MSU fans to circumvent the ruling and continue the tradition, the ban was in effect until 2010.

That spring, the 12 schools of the SEC agreed to a compromise on artificial noisemakers, acknowledging the role cowbells play in the history of Mississippi State University by amending the conference by-law. In the fall of 2010, on a one-year trial with specified restrictions, cowbells were permitted in Davis Wade Stadium for the first time in 36 years. And due to MSU fans' adherence to the rules outlined by the league, cowbells will continue to be allowed with similar restrictions in place. In 2012, the rule was made permanent by the SEC.

Maroon and white
Maroon and White are the distinctive colors of Mississippi State University athletic teams, dating back over a century to the very first football game ever played by the school's student-athletes.

On November 15, 1895, the first Mississippi A&M football team was preparing for a road trip to Jackson, Tennessee., to play Southern Baptist University (now called Union University) the following day. Since every college was supposed to have its own uniform colors, the A&M student body requested that the school's team select a suitable combination.

Considering making this choice an honor, the inaugural State team gave the privilege to team captain W.M. Matthews. Accounts report that without hesitation Matthews chose Maroon and White.

Recruiting 

Mississippi State Bulldogs Football 247Sports team recruiting rankings.

First round draft picks
Mississippi State has had 15 players selected in the first round of professional football drafts.

National Football League

 1949 – Harper Davis
 1956 – Art Davis
 1959 – Billy Stacy
 1975 – Jimmy Webb
 1982 – Glen Collins & Johnie Cooks
 1983 – Michael Haddix
 1996 – Eric Moulds & Walt Harris
 2011 – Derek Sherrod
 2012 – Fletcher Cox
 2019 – Jeffery Simmons, Montez Sweat & Johnathan Abram
 2022 – Charles Cross

Coaching staff

Head coaches

The program has had 35 head coaches since it began play during the 1895 season, and has played more than 1,050 games over 111 seasons. From December 2008 though November 2017, Dan Mullen served as Mississippi State's head coach. Mike Leach was the head coach at Mississippi State from January 9, 2020 until his sudden death from heart complications on December 12, 2022. The current head coach at Mississippi State is Zach  Arnett since his hiring on December 14, 2022.

Historic coaching hire
Mississippi State made history on December 1, 2003, when it hired Sylvester Croom as its head football coach. Croom was the first African-American named to such a position in the history of the Southeastern Conference (SEC).

Future opponents

Intra-division opponents
Mississippi State plays the other six SEC West opponents once per season.

Non-division opponents 
Mississippi State plays Kentucky as a permanent non-division opponent annually and rotates around the East division among the other six schools.

Non-conference opponents 
Announced schedules as of August 5, 2022.

References

External links

 

 
American football teams established in 1895
1895 establishments in Mississippi